A Kalliroscope is an art device/technique based on rheoscopic fluids invented by artist Paul Matisse.

External links

kalliroscope.com

Artistic techniques
Fluid dynamics
Educational toys